Deh Now-e Milas (also Romanized as Deh Now-e Mīlās and Deh Now-ye Mīlās) is a village in Milas Rural District, in the Central District of Lordegan County, Chaharmahal and Bakhtiari Province, Iran. At the 2006 census, its population was 3,331, in 610 families.

References 

Populated places in Lordegan County